Donald Swaelens (1935 – 25 April 1975) was a Belgian professional golfer.

Golf career
Like his father Jules, Swaelens made his career as a club professional at Royal Latem Golf Club. He also worked as a touring professional, intermittently playing on the European circuit. He won the 1966 Woodlawn Tournament, played at the Ramstein Air Base in West Germany, the 1967 German Open, and the 1971 Agfa-Gevaert Tournament, also in West Germany.

In 1972, Swaelens joined the European Tour during its inaugural season. In 1973, he finished tied for second, with Dale Hayes, in the Viyella PGA Championship held at Wentworth, three shots behind Peter Oosterhuis. This would be the best finish of the his European Tour career. In 1974, he finished third in the Dutch Open at Koninklijke Haagsche Golf & Country Club. He also finished T-7 at that year's Open Championship, the best finish of his career at a major championship.

Until Nicolas Colsaerts played in 2013, he was the only Belgian golfer to be invited to the Masters Tournament, although the cancer prevented him from taking part. Swaelens died two weeks after the 1975 Masters Tournament at the age of 39 from cancer.

Memorial Tournament 
The Donald Swaelens Memorial (later called the Donald Swaelens Challenge) is played each year celebrating his memory. The tournament was originally an 8-man professional tournament sponsored by Laurent-Perrier but is now an amateur tournament.

Winners of the trophy include:
1976 Seve Ballesteros
1977 Nick Faldo
1978 Nick Faldo
1993 Lara Tadiotto
1995 Arnaud Langenaeken
1998 Nicolas Colsaerts (when 15 years old)

Professional wins

European circuit wins (4)
1966 Woodlawn International Invitational, Omnium International d'Evian
1967 German Open
1971 Agfa-Gevaert Tournament

Other wins (9)
1958 Gleneagles Hotel Foursomes Tournament (with Ian McDonald)
1966 Memorial Olivier Barras
1967 Omnium of Belgium, Memorial Olivier Barras
1969 Omnium of Belgium
1970 Omnium of Belgium
1971 Omnium of Belgium
1972 Omnium of Belgium
1973 Omnium of Belgium

Results in major championships

Note: Swaelens only played in The Open Championship.

CUT = missed the half-way cut (3rd round cut in 1968 and 1970)
"T" indicates a tie for a place

Team appearances
World Cup (representing Belgium): 1958, 1959, 1961, 1962, 1963, 1964, 1965, 1966, 1967, 1968, 1969, 1970,  1971, 1972, 1973, 1974
Joy Cup (representing the Rest of Europe): 1958
Double Diamond International (representing Continental Europe): 1972, 1973, 1974 (captain)
Marlboro Nations' Cup (representing Belgium): 1972, 1973
Sotogrande Match  (representing the Continent of Europe): 1974

References

External links

Belgian male golfers
European Tour golfers
Sportspeople from East Flanders
People from Sint-Martens-Latem
1935 births
1975 deaths